|}

The December Novices' Chase is a Grade 2 National Hunt steeplechase in Great Britain which is open to horses aged four years or older. It is run at Doncaster over a distance of about 3 miles (2 miles 7 furlongs and 214 yards or 4,828 metres), and during its running there are eighteen fences to be jumped. The race is for novice chasers, and it is scheduled to take place each year in December.

The race was first run in 1988.  Prior to 2014 it was run at Lingfield Park and was the only National Hunt event run at the course with graded status. It was transferred to Doncaster by Arena Racing Company, the owner of both courses. The Summit Juvenile Hurdle used to be contested on the same day at Lingfield but was transferred to Doncaster in 2010 – the two races are now both run at the same meeting again.

Winners

See also
 Horse racing in Great Britain
 List of British National Hunt races

References
 Racing Post:
 , 

 pedigreequery.com – December Novices' Chase – Lingfield.
 rte.ie – "Lingfield abandoned due to frost" (2005).
 breakingnews.ie – "Lingfield abandoned" (2006).
 rte.ie – "Cheltenham and Lingfield abandoned" (2008).

National Hunt races in Great Britain
Doncaster Racecourse
Lingfield Park Racecourse
National Hunt chases
Recurring sporting events established in 1988
1988 establishments in England